Summary Execution under the Moorish Kings of Granada  is an oil on canvas painting by Henri Regnault. Completed in 1870, it was acquired by the state from Regnault’s heirs for display at the Musée du Luxembourg. It is currently in the collection of the Musée d'Orsay. A study for the figure of the executioner is also in the collections of the British Museum.

Subject
The subject is a scene of decapitation that takes place in an architectural setting based on the Alhambra, suffused throughout with an sunset glow. A black executioner stands on a flight of marble stairs, calmly wiping the blood off his scimitar after striking his victim down. The brilliance of the colours contrasts with the repulsiveness of the subject. The low angle at which the scene is depicted, effectively placing the viewer at the executioners feet, gives his life-sized figure an imposing presence. His emotional detachment and relaxed gesture contrast with the gruesome foreground in which the blood drips down the steps from the lifeless body lying at his feet to its just-severed head.

A fascination for arbitrary punishments carried out in settings of great splendour far from Europe was a common theme of Orientalist paintings. The power of these works drew on the contrast between what was depicted and contemporary European ideas about reducing the scope and barbarity of judicial execution, thus making the representation of the act both thrilling and terrifying. They were also part of a wider tendency in orientalist art to choose disturbing subjects such as slave markets or acts of violence and present them in a style that was both “real” and escapist.

In the late nineteenth century, the North African male body became the subject of homoerotic fascination for some Europeans. A hint of homoeroticism underpins the elegant, muscular figure of the executioner, suggesting fascination and threat.

Style and technique
In technical terms, there is an extreme contrast between the meticulously detailed depiction of the architectural interior in the background and the gruesome realism of the spattering blood in the foreground. Regnault’s studio assistant Clairin reported that he literally threw the red paint at the canvas in order to get a completely natural effect. There is also a tension between the “hyper-real” detail of the setting and the figures - Regnault made extensive and detailed sketches in preparation for the work, as well as working from photographs of the architectural motifs - and the fictional, fantasy world represented in the scene. Regnault himself described the painting as showing “the richest civilisation and the keenest cruelty coexisting in titanic, frightful splendour.”

History
The painting was Regnault’s third of his annual despatches to Paris after winning the Prix de Rome and it is possibly Regnault's most celebrated work. Painted in Tangiers, it was first exhibited at 'Les Envois de Rome' at the École des Beaux-Arts, Paris in 1871.  It has been exhibited on loan many times:

1871 - Les Envois de Rome - Ecole nationale supérieure des Beaux-Arts - Paris
1871-74 - International Exhibition - London
1873 - International Exhibition - Vienna 
1874 - Musée du Luxembourg - Paris 
1878 - Exposition Universelle - Paris
1974 - Grand Palais - Paris
1978-79 - Autour de quelques oeuvres du Second Empire, Palais de Tokyo, Paris
1991-92 - Henri Regnault (1843-1871), :fr:Musée des Avelines, Saint-Cloud
1997 - Les peintres français et l'Espagne de Delacroix à Manet, Goya Museum, Castres
2011 - Le génie de l'Orient. L'Europe moderne et les arts de l'Islam, Museum of Fine Arts of Lyon

Critical reception
:fr:Roger Marx wrote that Regnault was often drawn, while in Rome, towards the unusual and the bizarre, such as the beheading in Benvenuto Cellini’s Perseus with the Head of Medusa. He also commented unfavourably on the painting’s lack of sympathy or pity.

Henry Roujon admired the painting’s technical virtuosity and use of colour, but, like Marx, deplored what he considered the gratuitous horror of the subject, rendered without “emotion, anguish or pity.” Gustave Geffroy considered it “vulgarly melodramatic.”

John Charles Van Dyke’s view was that “people rather like the Regnault Execution scene, not because of its color and handling, but because it hints at a ghastly story, and they like the humanized monkeys, not because of any pictorial quality, but because they are funny.”

References

1870 paintings
Oil on canvas paintings
French paintings
Paintings in the collection of the Musée d'Orsay
Orientalist paintings